The Women's hoop gymnastics at the 2017 Summer Universiade in Taipei was held on 29 August at the Taipei Nangang Exhibition Center.

Schedule
All times are Taiwan Standard Time (UTC+08:00).

Results

References

Women's rhythmic individual hoop